Triangle Film Corporation (also known as Triangle Motion Picture Company) was a major American motion-picture studio, founded in July 1915 in Culver City, California and terminated 7 years later in 1922.

History 
The studio was founded in July 1915 by Harry and Roy Aitken, two brothers from the Wisconsin farmlands who pioneered the studio system of Hollywood's Golden Age. Harry was also D. W. Griffith's partner at Reliance-Majestic Studios; both parted with the Mutual Film Corporation in the wake of The Birth of a Nation unexpected success that year. Triangle was envisioned as a prestige studio based on the producing abilities of filmmakers D. W. Griffith, Thomas Ince and Mack Sennett.

On November 23, 1915, the Triangle Film Corporation opened a state-of-the-art motion picture theater in Massillon, Ohio. The Lincoln Theater is still an operational movie theater owned and operated by the Massillon Lion's Club. The theater has been restored and is host to a yearly film festival dedicated to the films of Dorothy and Lillian Gish.

Eventually, the studio suffered from bloat. By 1917, producer Adolph Zukor had taken control of all of the studio's assets. In June 1917, Thomas H. Ince and Mack Sennett left the company and sold their remaining interests. In  1917, Triangle's distribution network of film exchanges were sold off to the W.W. Hodkinson company for $600,000. Goldwyn Pictures purchased the Triangle Studios in Culver City in 1918.

Triangle continued to produce films until 1919, when it ceased operations. Films using the Triangle name were still released to the general public until 1923.

Selected filmography 

With the exception of Oh, Mabel Behave (1922), all of Triangle's films were released between 1915 and 1919. Most films were made on the West Coast, but some of Triangle's production took place in Fort Lee, New Jersey.

1915
 Jordan Is a Hard Road
 Fickle Fatty's Fall
 A Game Old Knight
 Fatty and the Broadway Stars
 The Winged Idol
1916
 Fatty and Mabel Adrift
 Peggy
 He Did and He Didn't
 His Hereafter
 Bright Lights
 Cinders of Love
 Hell's Hinges
 The Flying Torpedo
 Hoodoo Ann
 Mad Maid
 The Raiders
 His Wife's Mistakes
 Bucking Society
 His Bread and Butter
 The Other Man
 The Stepping Stone
 Civilization
 Rough Knight
 A Dash of Courage
 The Primal Lure
 The Bugle Call
 Going Straight
 The Mystery of the Leaping Fish
 The Dividend
 His First False Step
 An Innocent Magdalene
 Flirting with Fate
 Our American Boys in the European War
 Courtin' of Caliope Clew
 The Winning Punch
 Nell Dale's Men Folks
 The French Milliner
 The Patriot
 Intolerance
 The Dawn Maker
 His Last Scent
 The Return of Draw Egan
 Pathways of Life
 His Busted Trust
 The Devil's Double
 A Bachelor's Finish
 The Little School Ma'am
1917
 Heart Strategy
 His Deadly Undertaking
 When Hearts Collide
 Done in Oil
 Villa of the Movies
 Dodging His Dream
 Hobbled Hearts
 A Self-Made Hero
 His Rise and Tumble
 Her Candy Kid
 A Finished Product
 Innocent Sinners
 A Berth Scandal
 Her Nature Dance
 Her Finishing Touch
 Her Birthday Knight
 A Dog's Own Tale
 Skirt Strategy
 A Dishonest Burglar
 His Criminal Career
 Happiness
 Her Torpedoed Love
 His One Night Stand
 A Laundry Clean-Up
 The Little Yank
 The Man Who Made Good
 The Camera Cure
 Twin Troubles
 American – That's All
 A Strange Transgressor
 Dad's Downfall
 Her Excellency, the Governor
 The Flame of the Yukon
 His Sudden Rival
 The House of Scandal
 The Mother Instinct
 A Successful Failure
 Sudden Jim
 Borrowed Plumage
 An Even Break
 The Food Gamblers
 Golden Rule Kate
 His Cool Nerve
 Master of His Home
 They're Off
 Wee Lady Betty
 Wooden Shoes
 Grafters
 Her Donkey Love
 The Man Hater
 Ten of Diamonds
 Idolators
 Polly Ann
 All at Sea
 His Baby Doll
 His Unconscious Conscience
 Mountain Dew
 Bond of Fear
 The Devil Dodger
 Flying Colors
 Her Fickle Fortune
 Broadway Arizona
 His Saving Grace
 The Sultan's Wife
 The Tar Heel Warrior
 Ashes of Hope
 A Phantom Husband
 One Shot Ross
 Wild Sumac
 Cassidy
 The Firefly of Tough Luck
 His Busy Day
 The Stainless Barrier
 Fighting Back
 Up or Down?
 Indiscreet Corinne
 The Medicine Man
 A Case at Law
 The Fuel of Life
 For Valour
 The Regenerates
 The Cold Deck
 The Sudden Gentleman
 Fanatics
 The Learnin' of Jim Benton
 The Ship of Doom
 Because of a Woman
 The Maternal Spark
 A Counterfeit Scent
 Until They Get Me
 Framing Framers
 The Gown of Destiny
1918
 Without Honor
 Betty Takes a Hand
 His Hidden Shame
 The Man Above the Law
 I Love You
 The Law's Outlaw
 The Argument
 The Flames of Chance
 The Gun Woman
 Her American Husband
 The Hopper
 Limousine Life
 Captain of His Soul
 Real Folks
 From Two to Six
 Keith of the Border
 Little Red Decides
 A Soul in Trust
 Heiress for a Day
 The Shoes That Danced
 The Hard Rock Breed
 The Sea Panther
 Caught with the Goods
 The Answer
 Faith Endurin
 Innocent's Progress
 Nancy Comes Home
 The Love Brokers
 The Vortex
 The Boss of the Lazy Y
 The Law of the Great Northwest
 Who Killed Walton?
 The Hand at the Window
 Society for Sale
 The Lonely Woman
 Paying His Debt
 An Honest Man
 Mlle. Paulette
 High Stakes
 Her Decision
 Wolves of the Border
 Old Hartwell's Cub
 Who Is to Blame?
 Old Love for New
 The Man Who Woke Up
 The Red-Haired Cupid
 The Last Rebel
 Madame Sphinx
 His Enemy, the Law
 Station Content
 Closin' In
 You Can't Believe Everything
 The Fly God
 The Painted Lily
 Everywoman's Husband
 A Good Loser
 Hell's End
 Marked Cards
 By Proxy
 False Ambition
 Beyond the Shadows
 The Golden Fleece
 Alias Mary Brown
 The Price of Applause
 Cactus Crandall
 Shifting Sands
 The Ghost Flower
 High Tide
 Daughter Angele
 Wild Life
 The Mask
 Untamed
 Mystic Faces
 The Secret Code
 The Atom
 Desert Law
 The Grey Parasol
 Tony America
 The Pretender
 The Reckoning Day
 Deuce Duncan
 Love's Pay Day
 The Silent Rider
 Irish Eyes
 Crown Jewels
 Wife or Country
1919
 Restless Souls
 Secret Marriage
 Child of M'sieu
 A Wild Goose Chase
 It's a Bear
 The Little Rowdy
 Toton the Apache
 A Royal Democrat
 A Regular Fellow
 The Follies Girl
 Taxi
 The Water Lily
 The Mayor of Filbert
 The Root of Evil
 Love's Prisoner
 Upside Down
 Prudence on Broadway
 Muggsy
 Little Miss Deputy
 Mistaken Identity
 One Against Many
 Three Black Eyes

References

Bibliography 
 Frederic Lombardi. Allan Dwan and the Rise and Decline of the Hollywood Studios. McFarland, 2013.

External links 

  La Triangle (1915–1919) – Cinéma : Archives, research and history at the Cinémathèque française
  Strategic failure of the Triangle – Marc Vernet (Cinémarchives)

 
Silent film studios
Defunct American film studios
Film production companies of the United States
Film distributors of the United States
Film studios in Southern California
Defunct companies based in Greater Los Angeles
Entertainment companies based in California
Companies based in Culver City, California
Mass media companies established in 1915
Mass media companies disestablished in 1919
1915 establishments in California
1919 disestablishments in California
1910s in California
American silent films by studio